Shaaticup (Bengali: শাটিকাপ) is a Bangladeshi crime drama streaming television series directed by Mohammad Touqir Islam. The eight-episode series was released on 13 January 2022 on Chorki.

Premise
Hannan and Joynal plan to invade drug lord Sohel's monopoly kingdom. Sohel assigns Uttam, the most influential Investigation Officer in the area, to capture Hannan and Joynal. Several complex moves come one after another in this SnakeLudo game. Who will win this game? Drug lord, new traders, cunning officer, or anyone beyond imagination?

Cast
 Ahsabul Yamin Riad as Joynal
 Omar Masum as Babu
 Amit Rudra as Uttam Kumar
 Najmus Saaqib as Hannan
 Sajia Khanom as Tuli (Babu's wife)
 Galib Sarder as Shohel Bhai
 Wasikul Islam Romit as Liakot Ali
 Mahinur Rahman Khan as Asad
 Mehdi Hasan Rumie as Kazi Maruf
 Akash bin Osama as Mizu Dakat
 Rifat Bin Sajid as Faju
 Kazi Sushmin Afsana as Lisa Aarzoomand
 Shiblee Noman as Habibul Bashar

Production
Principal photography has taken place in different locations of Rajshahi, Bangladesh from October 2020 to August 2021.

Release
Shaaticup aired on Chorki on 13 January 2022. A premiere screening was held in Rajshahi at District Council Auditorium on the same day.

Episodes

Reception
Shadique Mahbub Islam of The Financial Express praised the series, commenting, "The series has retained its local flavour in its dialogues and character development, so much so that it feels like an authentic visual experience of the city, the char, the Padma river".

Shankhayan Ghosh wrote in Film Companion, "Shaaticup is making a splash in Bangladesh, being talked about for the raw authenticity it brings to the screen and its eye for local details."

References

External links
 Shaaticup at Chorki
 

Chorki original programming
Bengali-language web series
Bangladeshi web series
2022 web series debuts
2022 Bangladeshi television series debuts
Streaming television in Bangladesh
Bangladeshi crime drama television series